Falsadjinga postnotata is a species of beetle in the family Cerambycidae, and the only species in the genus Falsadjinga. It was described by Pic in 1926.

References

Desmiphorini
Beetles described in 1926
Monotypic Cerambycidae genera